Viktor Uspaskich (born 24 July 1959) is a Russian-born Lithuanian entrepreneur and politician.

Early life
He was born in the village of Urdoma, Arkhangelsk Oblast in what was then the Russian SFSR. He was born into a family of forestry workers. He graduated from Urdom high school in 1976. From 1977 to 1979, he served in the Soviet Army. After the army, he continued to work in the construction of gas pipelines. He arrived in the Lithuanian SSR in 1985 and worked as a welder in the gas industry. He left shortly after for Finland, before returning in 1987, divorcing his Belarusian wife with two children (Julia, Eduard) and marrying Jolanta Blažytė. He formed his own company Efektas in 1990, and took citizenship of the newly formed Republic of Lithuania in 1991.

With power he quickly gained tremendous success in his business empire that now includes the importation of natural gas from Gazprom, in addition to flourishing enterprises in the food production and animal fodder industries.

Political career

Between 1997 and 2003 was chairman of the Association of Lithuanian Employers, and in 2000 was selected as a non-party member of the Naujoji sąjunga (New Union) social liberal party in the Seimas (parliament). His own political ambitions led him to form the Darbo Partija (Labour Party) in 2003. The DP scored highly during the 2004 European Parliamentary Elections, gaining 30.2% of the popular vote and returning 5 MEPs. That same year, he became Minister of Economic Affairs in Lithuania's coalition government. He held this until 2006.

Since 2014, and previously from 2009 to 2012, Viktor Uspaskich has been a Member of the European Parliament for Lithuania.

The European Parliament has twice stripped Uspaskich's legal immunity.

Tax fraud
In the end of May 2006 his political party Darbo Partija (Labour Party) was suspected of income violations by the financial police.

Victor Uspaskich flew to his hometown Urdoma (Russia) to his brother's funeral and came back in late 2007. He is believed to have been hiding from the law enforcement and interpol. Lithuania had issued an arrest warrant for Uspaskich, who was in Russia, as he was suspected of tax fraud. In July 2013, Uspaskich was sentenced to 4 years in prison for tax fraud.

He has not served the prison sentence claiming his legal immunity as member of the Lithuanian Parliament and, since the May 2014 elections, member of the European Parliament. Even though the immunity has been stripped, Lithuanian authorities were not able to actually persecute Uspaskich due to limtation period and the formal reorganisation of the Labour Party.

Covid-19 curing water 
On 27 December 2020, Uspaskich started advertising mineral water that can be bought via a network of individuals across the country. He claims that the water improves the immune system and protects against Covid-19. These statements have been condemned by politicians, medics, various officials, as well as by his own party members.

The company selling the water is mainly owned by Uspaskich's children.

Lithuania's authorities have started investigations of illicit advertisement which can lead to a fine of up to €100,000.

Homophobic and transphobic remarks 
On 10 January 2021 Uspaskich published a Facebook video where he spoke about LGBT people, calling them "perverts":

Those who put their dick under a skirt and go into the street and shout, they are (...) perverts, and such things must not be tolerated.

He has been asked to apologise publicly by his group within the European Parliament, Renew Europe which, after an internal disciplinary procedure, has terminated his membership. After this, the Labour Party announced its withdrawal from Alliance of Liberals and Democrats for Europe Party.

References

External links
 Darbo Partija home page

1959 births
Living people
People from Arkhangelsk Oblast
Members of the Seimas
Labour Party (Lithuania) politicians
Labour Party (Lithuania) MEPs
MEPs for Lithuania 2009–2014
Lithuanian people of Russian descent
Ministers of Economy of Lithuania
MEPs for Lithuania 2014–2019
MEPs for Lithuania 2019–2024
People convicted of tax crimes
Lithuanian politicians convicted of crimes